Khorramabad-e Olya (also Romanized as Khorramābād-e ‘Olyā; also known as Shahveh-ye ‘Olyā) is a village in Jannatabad Rural District, Salehabad District, Salehabad County, Razavi Khorasan Province, Iran. At the 2006 census, its population was 1,098, in 222 families.

References 

Populated places in   Torbat-e Jam County